Hanunoo, or Hanunó'o, is a language spoken by Mangyans in the island of Mindoro, Philippines.

It is written in the Hanunoo script.

Phonology

Consonants

Vowels 

  can be heard as  within closed syllables.
  can be heard as  within word-final syllables.
  can be heard as an open-mid  among some speakers in certain words.

Distribution
Hanunoo is spoken in the following locations according to Barbian (1977):
Barrio Tugtugin, San Jose, Occidental Mindoro
Naluak, Magsaysay, Occidental Mindoro (on the upper Caguray River)
Bamban, Magsaysay, Occidental Mindoro (also with Ratagnon and Bisayan residents)

References

Further reading

External links
 Hanunuo , Mangyan Heritage Center. (About the people.)

Southern Mindoro languages
Mindoro